Zhassulan Mukhtarbekuly (born April 3, 1984 in Kzyl-Orda) is a male freestyle wrestler from Kazakhstan. He participated in Men's freestyle 55 kg at the 2008 Summer Olympics, where he lost in the Round of 16 to Dilshod Mansurov of Uzbekistan.

External links
 Wrestler profile on beijing2008.com

Living people
1984 births
Wrestlers at the 2008 Summer Olympics
Olympic wrestlers of Kazakhstan
Kazakhstani male sport wrestlers
21st-century Kazakhstani people